This list of DePauw University alumni includes notable alumni of DePauw University, an American institution of higher education located in Greencastle, Indiana.

Academia and science

 Joseph P. Allen – NASA Space Shuttle astronaut
 Charles A. Beard – author; one of most influential historians of early 20th century; husband of Mary Ritter Beard
 Mary Ritter Beard – archivist; historian; leader in women's suffrage movement; wife of Charles A. Beard
 Olivia Castellini – physicist
 David Crocker – philosopher; senior research scholar, School of Public Policy at University of Maryland
 Paul S. Dunkin – writer; professor of library science
 Thomas H. Hamilton – former president, State University of New York and University of Hawaii
 Laurin L. Henry – academic
 George W. Hoss – president, Kansas State Normal (now Emporia State University) in Kansas
 Barbara Ibrahim – prominent sociologist of the Arab world; founding director of the John D. Gerhart Center for Philanthropy and Civic Engagement at the American University in Cairo
 Paul Rowland Julian – meteorologist; discovered, with Roland A. Madden, atmospheric phenomena known as Madden–Julian oscillation 
 Percy L. Julian – research chemist; pioneer in chemical synthesis of medicinal drugs
 Daniel Trembly MacDougal - botanist, plant biologist
 Margaret Mead – cultural anthropologist, two years, completed B.A. degree at Barnard College.
 Major Reuben Webster Millsaps – founder of Millsaps College in Mississippi
 Ferid Murad – recipient of 1998 Nobel Prize in Physiology or Medicine
 J. Robert Nelson (1920–2004), B.A. 1941 – dean of the Vanderbilt University Divinity School, 1957–1960; dean of the Boston University School of Theology, 1965–1985
 Hakkı Ögelman – Turkish physicist; astrophysicist
 William H. Riker – political scientist
 Phillips Robbins – member of the National Academy of Sciences and the Institute of Medicine; has had continuous funding from NIH for over 47 years
 Michael Stuart, B.A. 1979 – Sports physician and orthopedic surgeon at the Mayo Clinic
 Winona Hazel Welch – (1919–1923) president of the Indiana Academy of Science, head of botany and bacteriology at DePauw.

Art

Gary Hugh Brown, artist, painter, draftsman, and Professor Emeritus of Art at the University of California, Santa Barbara

Business

Timothy Collins – financier; founder of Ripplewood Holdings; director, Citigroup
 Angie Hicks – founder of Angie's List
 Charles T. Hinde – railroad executive; founder of Hotel del Coronado; shipping executive
 Eli Lilly – founder of Eli Lilly and Company; philanthropist
 John S. McMillin – lawyer and businessman; former president of the Tacoma and Roche Harbor Lime Company
 Mary Meeker – Internet equity research analyst at Morgan Stanley, dubbed "Queen of the Net"
 Jeffrey T. Mezger – president and chief executive officer of KB Home
 Steven M. Rales – chairman of Danaher Corporation
 Bill Rasmussen – co-founder of ESPN
 Scott Rasmussen – co-founder of ESPN; founder of Rasmussen Reports
 Al Ries – author, marketing expert
 Steve Sanger – former president and chief executive officer of General Mills
 Howard C. Sheperd, Sr. – former president of National City Bank of New York (now Citibank)
 Fred C. Tucker – businessperson, real estate broker
 James D. Weddle – managing partner of Edward Jones

Entertainment

 Scott Adsit – actor, played Pete Hornberger on television sitcom 30 Rock
 Shibani Bathija – screenwriter
 Alicia Berneche – operatic soprano
 Joseph Brent – mandolinist, composer, and founder of 9 Horses
 Pamela Coburn – operatic soprano
 Annie Corley – film and television actress
 David Cryer – singer and Broadway actor, Phantom of the Opera
 Gretchen Cryer – co-creator, I'm Getting My Act Together and Taking It on the Road
 Bill Hayes – stage and television actor, Days of Our Lives
 Jimmy Ibbotson – singer-songwriter and musician, Nitty Gritty Dirt Band
 Sue Keller – ragtime pianist, composer and arranger
 David McMillin – singer-songwriter
 Julie McWhirter – voice actress, known for Hanna-Barbera cartoons, such as Drak Pack and The Smurfs
 Larry D. Nichols –  puzzle enthusiast; inventor of Pocket Cube
 Drew Powell – actor
 Kid Quill – recording artist
 Jane Randolph – film actress, known for 1940s films such as Cat People and Jealousy
 Alice Ripley – actress, singer, played Diana in Next to Normal
 Pharez Whitted – jazz trumpeter, composer, and producer
 Margaret Jones Wiles – composer, violinist

Government and politics

 Karen Koning AbuZayd – Commissioner-General for U.N. Relief and Works Agency for Palestine Refugees in Near East (2005–10)
 Joseph W. Barr – U.S. Secretary of the Treasury (1968–1969); chairman, Federal Deposit Insurance Corporation
 Thomas W. Benett – Governor of Idaho Territory (1871–1875); served in Indiana State Senate
 Albert Beveridge – U.S. Senator from Indiana (1899–1911)
 John Berkshire – Justice of the Indiana Supreme Court
 Andrew H. Burke – second Governor of North Dakota (1891–1892)
 David L. Carden – U.S. Ambassador to Association of Southeast Asian Nations
 Sutemi Chinda – former Japanese Ambassador to the United States
 Anna Elizabeth Dickinson – abolitionist, suffragist, first woman to speak before U.S. Congress
 Samuel H. Elrod – Governor of South Dakota (1905–07)
 Bob Franks – former U.S. Congressman
 Willard Gemmill – Justice of the Indiana Supreme Court
 James P. Goodrich – Governor of Indiana (1917–21)
 Lee H. Hamilton – co-chair, Iraq Study Group; vice chair, 9/11 Commission; retired United States Representative
 Edwin Hammond - Justice of the Indiana Supreme Court
 George Howk - Justice of the Indiana Supreme Court
 Wayne Hsiung - co-founder, Direct Action Everywhere
 Patricia Ireland – former president, National Organization for Women
 John A. Johnson – General Counsel of the Air Force; General Counsel of NASA; chief executive officer, COMSAT
 Vernon Jordan Jr. – broker and executive; former president, National Urban League; personal friend and advisor to former U.S. President Bill Clinton
 David E. Lilienthal – public official; writer; businessman; chairman, Tennessee Valley Authority (1941–1946); known as "Mr. TVA"
 John McNaughton – U.S. Assistant Secretary of Defense and U.S. Navy Secretary-designate (at time of death)
 Douglas J. Morris – Justice of the Indiana Supreme Court
 Jay Holcomb Neff – publisher; 1904–05 Mayor of Kansas City, Missouri
 James M. Ogden – 26th Indiana Attorney General 1929-33
 Howard C. Petersen – U.S. Assistant Secretary of War
 Josh Pitcock – Former chief of staff to Vice President Mike Pence
 Dan Quayle – 44th Vice President of the United States (under U.S. President George H. W. Bush) 
 Halsted Ritter – Judge of the United States District Court for the Southern District of Florida (1929–1936)
 Ross Thompson Roberts – Judge of the United States District Court for the Western District of Missouri (1982–1987)
 William Morris Sparks – Judge of the United States Court of Appeals for the Seventh Circuit (1929–1950)
 Hardress Swaim – Judge of the United States Court of Appeals for the Seventh Circuit (1950–1957)
 Elmer Thomas – U.S. Senator from Oklahoma (1927–51)
 George R. Throop – Chancellor of Washington University (1927–44)
 James E. Watson – U.S. Senator from Indiana; Senate Majority Leader (1929–33)
 Guilford M. Wiley – former Wisconsin State Assemblyman
 James Wilkerson – Judge of the United States District Court for the Northern District of Illinois (1922–1948)

Journalism

 Bret Baier – host of Special Report with Bret Baier (Fox News Channel)
 Tracey Chang – correspondent, CNBC Asia; 2009 Miss New York USA
 Gil Duran is the California opinion editor for The Sacramento Bee
 Stephen F. Hayes – author; columnist, Weekly Standard
 Dave Jorgenson – journalist and TikToker, The Washington Post
 John McWethy – former correspondent, ABC News
 Bernard Kilgore, managing editor of the Wall Street Journal from 1941 to 1965 and head of the Dow Jones company
 William N. Oatis – journalist detained 1951–1953 by the Communist government of Czechoslovakia
 Eugene C. Pulliam – newspaper publisher, The Indianapolis Star and The Arizona Republic
 James C. Quayle – newspaper publisher
 Ben C. Solomon – Pulitzer Prize-winning New York Times video journalist
 Jeri Kehn Thompson – radio talk show host; columnist, The American Spectator; wife of Fred Thompson (actor; former U.S. Senator from Tennessee (1994–2003); 2008 U.S. presidential candidate)

Literature

 Angus Cameron (1908–2002) – book editor and publisher
 Gretchen Cryer – actress, lyricist, writer
 Patricia Coombs – children's book author and illustrator, Dorrie the Little Witch series
 Matt Dellinger – writer, journalist, wrote the book Interstate 69: The Unfinished History of the Last Great American Highway
 Stephen F. Hayes – senior writer, Weekly Standard; wrote the book Cheney: The Untold Story of America's Most Powerful and Controversial Vice President
 John Jakes – novelist, North and South
 Adam Kennedy – actor, novelist, screenwriter, painter
 Bernard Kilgore – former editor, The Wall Street Journal; turned the publication into one of national significance
 Barbara Kingsolver – contemporary fiction writer; founder of Bellwether Prize for "literature of social change"
 Richard Peck – Newbery Medal-winning author
 Loren Pope – authority on colleges; wrote books Looking Beyond the Ivy League and Colleges That Change Lives
 James B. Stewart – recipient of 1988 Pulitzer Prize for Explanatory Journalism; wrote books including Blood Sport and DisneyWar
 Blanche Stillson – author and artist
 Minnetta Theodora Taylor (1860-1911) – wrote the lyrics to the National Suffrage Anthem

Military

 Harvey Weir Cook – fighter ace in World War I; leading figure in the development of aviation in the United States
 Nathan Kimball – Union General during Civil War
 Sergeant Henry Nash – member of Theodore Roosevelt's Rough Riders
 General David M. Shoup – Commandant of the Marine Corps; recipient of Medal of Honor (World War II)
 Alexander Vraciu – flying ace in World War II

Religion

 Albertus T. Briggs – Methodist minister
 Eunice Blanchard Poethig – Presbyterian minister

Sports
 
 Buzzie Bavasi – former general manager, Los Angeles Dodgers, California Angels and San Diego Padres
 Rob Boras – NFL assistant coach
 Brad Brownell – head men's basketball coach, Clemson University
 Dave Finzer – punter, Chicago Bears and Seattle Seahawks
 Ford Frick – Major League Baseball Commissioner (1951–1965)
 Joe Schoen – NFL executive, general manager of the New York Giants
 Wilfred Smith – National Football League player
 Brad Stevens – general manager, Boston Celtics
 Dick Tomey – college football coach
 Bill Rasmussen – co-founder of ESPN
 Scott Rasmussen – co-founder of ESPN; founder of Rasmussen Reports

See also

 List of people from Indiana

References

 
Depauw University alumni